The Britton Cottage, formerly known as the Cubberly House, is a house in the Historic Richmond Town museum complex in the neighborhood of Richmondtown, Staten Island, in New York City. The oldest section of the cottage dates to 1671, with additions in the mid-18th century. It is constructed of stone and timberframe components. The house was originally located at the intersection of New Dorp Lane and Cedar Grove Avenue in the New Dorp Beach section of Staten Island, but was moved to its current location in 1967 when it was threatened with demolition.

History of ownership
The earliest section of the house was built to serve court and government functions. One of its earliest known inhabitants was town clerk and justice of the peace Obadiah Holmes, the son of early Rhode Island settler Obadiah Holmes, who came from Long Island. In 1679, he transferred ownership of the property to his son Obadiah. Nathaniel Britton, an ancestor of the man for whom the cottage is named, acquired the house in 1695. Isaac Cubberly bought the house in 1761 and the house remained in his family for eighty-six years. Dr. Nathaniel Lord Britton, a botanist and the creator of the New York Botanical Garden, became the owner of the house in the 19th century and deeded the house to the Staten Island Institute of Arts and Sciences in 1915.

See also
List of the oldest buildings in New York
List of New York City Designated Landmarks in Staten Island
National Register of Historic Places listings in Richmond County, New York

References

Other sources 
Sterling, Keir B. 1997. Biographical Dictionary of American and Canadian Naturalists and Environmentalists, Westport, Conn: Greenwood Press. 
Neighborhood Preservation center, New York, NY

External links
 Britton Cottage on the Historic Richmond Town website

Houses in Staten Island
New York City Designated Landmarks in Staten Island
Historic Richmond Town
Houses completed in 1671